Machaidze is a Georgian surname. Notable people with the surname include:

Goderdzi Machaidze (born 1992), Georgian footballer 
Manuchar Machaidze (born 1949), Georgian footballer
Nino Machaidze (born 1983), Georgian opera singer

Georgian-language surnames